The 1985 Tanduay Rhum Makers season was the 11th season of the franchise in the Philippine Basketball Association (PBA).

Transactions

Notable dates
October 10: The Rhum Makers won for the second straight time since new coach Arturo Valenzona took over from Orly Castelo in the second round of eliminations in the third conference. Tanduay overcame a 12-point halftime deficit and turn the game around in the final period, outscoring the Coffee Makers by 20 points in a 133–119 victory over Great Taste. Import Ronnie Valentine topscored with 49 points while Ramon Fernandez added 30 points.

October 17: Tanduay enters the quarterfinal round with its fourth win against eight losses and eliminates Shell Bugbusters following a 133–124 win over Ginebra San Miguel. The Rhum Makers had a big third quarter run that gave them a 15-point lead entering the final period. Ronnie Valentine scored 41 points and Ramon Fernandez hit the 30-point mark for the second time as a Rhum Maker with 31 points.

Occurrences
Merlin Wilson, who was Tanduay's import back in 1979, returns after six years and played for the Rhum Makers in their first two games (only one game officially when their second outing vs Ginebra was ordered replayed) in the Open Conference. He was replaced by David Pope.  

After the first round of eliminations in the Third Conference with Tanduay having only one win in six games, a blockbuster trade took place sending their center Abet Guidaben to Manila Beer in favor of Ramon Fernandez. On October 1, Fernandez debut in Tanduay uniform in the Rhum Makers' 106–112 loss to Magnolia. 

Coach Orly Castelo was assigned by the ballclub to be the team's athletic director going into their last five games in the elimination round of the Third Conference, he was replaced by former Gilbey's coach Arturo Valenzona.

Roster

Trades

Imports

References

Tanduay Rhum Masters seasons
Tanduay